Nuno felting is a fabric felting technique developed by Polly Stirling, a fiber artist from New South Wales, Australia, around 1992. The name is derived from the Japanese word, "Nuno," meaning cloth.

Techniques 
This technique bonds loose fiber (usually sheep's wool) into a sheer fabric, such as silk gauze, creating a lightweight felt. Other fibers are also used to create different surface textures. Other fibers used include wool from camel, llama, alpaca, Mohair goat, Cashmere goat, yak, and rabbit fur.

Those fibers can completely cover the background fabric, or they may be used as a decorative design that allows the backing fabric to show. Nuno felting often combines several layers of loose fibers to build up the finished fabric's color, texture, and design elements.

The Nuno felting process is particularly suitable for creating lightweight fabrics used to make clothing. The use of silk or other stable fabric in the felt creates a fabric that will not stretch out of shape. Fabrics such as nylon, muslin, or other open weaves can be used as the felting background, which results in varying textures and colors.

Nuno felting creates a highly versatile fabric. It can be made in many weights to accommodate many different uses. It can be made much lighter in weight than traditional all-wool felt, accounting for its movement and drape. Because of the range of weights possible with the cloth very diverse garments can be made.

A lightweight Nuno fabric is made by laying one layer of loose fiber onto an open weave fabric base, creating a lightweight material. A much heavier Nuno fabric results from applying 3-4 layers of loose fibers onto an open weave base creating fabric ideal for a winter coat. A pair of boots could be made using even more layers of fibers.

References 

Giles, Jenne (2010). "Felt Fashion" Quarry Books., MA  

White, Christine (2007)."Uniquely Felt" Storey Publishing, MA 

Crafts
Textile arts